Hamnvik is the administrative centre of Ibestad Municipality in Troms og Finnmark county, Norway. It is located on the eastern tip of the island of Rolla.

The village is located at the western end of the Ibestad Tunnel, which is part of a ferry-free road connection to the mainland.  Ibestad Church is also located in Hamnvik.  The village is the commercial centre of the municipality with several stores, doctors, nursing homes, and schools.

References

Ibestad
Villages in Troms